The effects of climate change in Uganda are increasingly severe, affecting the lives of the country's citizens and its environment. It has led to extreme weather events such as unpredictable, prolonged drought and rainfall. Uganda's climate is mostly tropical with regular rainfall and sunshine patterns. Due to climate change the seasons have changed, with the rainy season becoming more variable in length and droughts more ubiquitous, especially in eastern and northeastern Uganda. Climate trends have the potential to affect development of Uganda, due to the vulnerability of Uganda's diverse environment.

Greenhouse gas emissions 
Uganda's greenhouse gas emission rate is very low, with carbon dioxide having never exceeding 150 kg per person per year, and totalling about 5 million tonnes per year. As of 2022, over 90% of Uganda's electricity comes from hydroelectricity, but many rural areas lack electricity and burn wood for cooking. The government has been criticized for causing deforestation.

Impact on the natural environment

Temperature and weather changes 
Since the 1960s, the average temperature in Uganda has increased by 1.3 °C, minimum temperatures have increased by 0.5–1.2 °C, and maximum temperatures have increased by 0.6–0.9 °C. Average temperatures have been observed to be increasing at a rate of 0.28 °C per decade, and daily temperature observations show significantly increasing amounts of hot days and nights every year . Climate change and changes in temperature is also affecting the Rwenzori Mountains, by causing glacier melting, increasing water levels in the Nyamwamba, Mubuku, and Ruimi Rivers. This has led to frequent flooding across the Rwenzori region. From 1906 to 2003, ice fields shrunk from 6.5 sq km to less than 1 sq km, and may completely melt in the next few years. In 2012, forest fires occurred in the Rwenzori region, causing the ice fields to melt, leading to the flooding of the river around the mountain.

In January 2022, intense rain around Mount Muhavura damaged buildings and roads in Kisoro District, especially affecting Nyarusiza, Muramba and Bunagana. Nine people were reported to have lost their lives and thousands of people were displaced or otherwise affected by this disaster.

On 1 March 2010, landslides occurred on the slopes of Mount Elgon, in the Bududa district, that killed 50 people and left thousands displaced. In 2018, there was another landslide on Mount Elgon, that killed 28 people, and left thousands displaced once again. As of 30 September 2021, a total of 20,739 people had been internally displaced. All landslides were caused by unusually prolonged rains.

In Kasese District, there is flooding almost every year, which causes a heavy impact on the lives and livelihood of residents. As a result, many schools and homes are buried or destroyed, leaving many displaced.

On Saturday 30 July 2022 at around 8pm EAT in the evening, there was a down pour of rain that took several hours up to around 7am EAT in the morning of Sunday 31 July 2022 in Mbale district, Sebei region and part of Teso region. This caused river Nabuyonga and river Namatala to burst the banks causing floods and landslides in Mbale district, Kapsinda Sub-county, Kapchorwa District. This led to a death toll of 24 in Mbale alone as of 2 August 2022, more bodies were recovered on that day. In Mbale,  most of the affected areas were Mbale City, Nabuyonga, Nkoma and Namakwekwe in Northern City Division and Namatala in Industrial City Division.

Impact on water resources 
Ugandan water supply and the sanitation sector has made substantial progress in urban areas from the mid-1990s until at least 2006, with substantial increases in coverage. Reforms from 1998 to 2003 included the commercialization and modernization of the National Water and Sewerage Corporation (NWSC) operating in cities and larger towns, as well as decentralization and private sector participation in small towns. Uganda has renewable water resources totalling to 2085 cubic meters per year, which is above the limit recognized internationally of 100 m3/year of water scarcity. Nevertheless, the water sector is developed and only about 0.5% of the total available water is utilized per year. 

Uganda has made some progress and improvements in water supply through improving facilities, increasing from 39% availability in 1990 to 48% in 2008, and, in remote and rural areas, from 40% in 1990 to 49% in 2008. This was not the case with the urban areas, which only increased from 35% in 1995 to 38% in 2008.

Ecosystems 

In 2010, Uganda had 6.93 Mha of tree cover, extending over 29% of its land area. In 2020, it lost 73.6 kha of tree cover, equivalent to 36.0 Mt of CO₂ emissions. From 2001 to 2020, 918 kha of tree cover was lost, equivalent to a 12% decrease in tree cover since 2000 and 413 Mt of CO₂ emissions. From 2001 to 2019, 3.8% of tree cover loss occurred in areas where dominant drivers resulted in deforestation. This has reduced both the ecosystem services the forests provide, including by diminishing wood yield and quality, and the biodiversity they support. 1.4 Mha of land has been burned, as of 2021. This total is normal, compared to the total for previous years, going back to 2001. The most fires recorded in a year was 2005, with 7.3 Mha burnt.

Impact on people

Economic impacts 
Uganda's economy consists of three major sectors, agriculture, industry, and services, all of which are highly vulnerable to the effects of climate change. Climate change is affecting the agricultural sector by reducing the area suitable for agriculture due to population growth, altering the length of the growing season, reducing yield potential, increasing the frequency and severity of extreme events (in particular droughts and floods), and increasing the incidence of plant diseases.

Climate change damage estimates in the agriculture, water, infrastructure and energy sectors collectively amount to 2–4% of the GDP between 2010 and 2050. With an estimated population of 48,432,863, Uganda is the leading country of organic farming, with an estimate of 231,157 hectares of land used for farming.

Agriculture and livestock 

Climate change has affected agriculture, which is the most important sector of the economy. Most of the production is from small scale farmers. Average temperatures range between 18 and 30 °C, but it can raise to about 37 °C in some areas.

Manufacturing sector 
The Ugandan manufacturing sector is dominated by agro-processing, food and beverages, household products, construction materials and fast-moving consumer goods. Most firms are small and medium enterprises concentrated in Kampala and the Central Region. Most products manufactured in Uganda are aimed at domestic consumption, and exports are limited to the regional markets in East Africa, including Rwanda, Burundi, South Sudan, Democratic Republic of the Congo (DRC), and the regions of Kenya and Tanzania bordering Uganda.

Manufacturing was reported to account for 15.8% of GDP in 2020, according to the World Bank, employing about 6.622% of formal-sector labour.

Health impacts 
Climate change is increasing the occurrences of water-borne diseases such as dysentery, cholera, hepatitis E, vector-borne diseases, respiratory diseases, malnutrition-related illnesses, and especially malaria. Uganda's fourth Health Sector Development Plan indicates the importance of developing "early warning systems and dissemination of weather forecasts to help health managers to improve preparedness and response".

Mitigation and adaptations 
A number of government agencies have been tasked with, or have prepared reports, on managing climate resilience, including the National Environmental Management Authority (NEMA), the Ministry of Water and Environment's Climate Change Department, the National Forestry Authority, the Ministry of Lands, Housing & Urban Development, the Ministry of Works and Transport, and the Uganda Wildlife Authority.

See also 
 Climate change in Africa
 Climate change adaptation
 Agriculture in Uganda
 Geography of Uganda

References 

Uganda
Geography of Uganda
Uganda